The following is an episode list of the A&E series The First 48.

Series overview

Episodes

Season 1 (2004)

Season 2 (2005)

Season 3 (2005–2006)

Season 4 (2006)

Season 5 (2007)

Season 6 (2007–2008)

Season 7 (2008)

Season 8 (2009)

Season 9 (2010)

Season 10 (2010–2011)

Season 11 (2011–2012)

Season 12 (2012)

Season 13 (2012–2013)

Season 14 (2013)

Season 15 (2014)

Season 16 (2015)

Season 17 (2015–2016)

Season 18 (2016–2017)

Season 19 (2017–2018)

Season 20 (2019)

Season 21 (2020–2021)

Season 22 (2021–2022)

Season 23 (2022–present)

References

External links
 

Lists of American non-fiction television series episodes